Parkdale can refer to several different things:

Places

Canada

Communities 
 Parkdale, Calgary, a neighbourhood in the city of Calgary, Alberta
 Parkdale, Edmonton, a neighbourhood in the city of Edmonton, Albrta
 Parkdale, Lunenburg, Nova Scotia
 Parkdale, Halifax, Nova Scotia
 Parkdale, Toronto, a neighbourhood in the city of Toronto, Ontario
 Parkdale, Prince Edward Island, a neighbourhood in the city of Charlottetown, Prince Edward Island
 Rural Municipality of Parkdale No. 498, Saskatchewan

Electoral Districts 
 Parkdale-Belvedere, a provincial electoral district in Prince Edward Island
 Parkdale—High Park, a federal House of Commons of Canada electoral district located in Toronto, Canada
 Parkdale—High Park (provincial electoral district), a provincial Legislative Assembly of Ontario electoral district located in Toronto, Ontario, Canada
 Parkdale (electoral district), a defunct Canadian House of Commons district in Toronto, Canada
 Parkdale (provincial electoral district), a defunct Legislative Assembly of Ontario district in Toronto, Ontario, Canada

Oceania
 Parkdale, Victoria, Australia
 Parkdale, New Zealand

United States
 Parkdale, Arkansas
 Parkdale, Colorado
 Parkdale, Michigan
 Parkdale, Minnesota
 Parkdale, Missouri
 Parkdale (Charlotte neighborhood), North Carolina
 Parkdale, Oregon

Schools
 Parkdale High School a school in Riverdale Park, Maryland, USA
 Parkdale School, a K-9 school in Parkdale, Edmonton, Alberta, Canada
 Parkdale School, Hamilton, a K-5 school in Hamilton, Ontario, Canada

Other uses 
 Parkdale Mall, a shopping mall located in Beaumont, Texas, U.S.
 "Parkdale", a song by Metric from the album Grow Up and Blow Away

See also

 Parkdale Avenue (disambiguation)
 Parkdale station (disambiguation)
 Parksdale
 
 Park (disambiguation)
 Dale (disambiguation)